Palitsi may refer to:

Palitsi, Elena Municipality, a village in Bulgaria
Palitsi Reservoir, a nearby reservoir